This is a list of episodes from the nineteenth season of Real Time with Bill Maher.

The episode scheduled for May 14 was canceled after Bill Maher tested positive for COVID-19 during the show's weekly testing for COVID. The episode was to feature Neil deGrasse Tyson, Max Brooks, and Dan Carlin as guests. The following May 21 show was cancelled as a precaution.

Episodes

References

External links
 
 HBO.com Episode List
 HBO.com Real Time with Bill Maher Free (audio-only) episodes and Overtime podcast
 TV.com Episode Guide

Real Time with Bill Maher seasons
2021 American television seasons
Television series impacted by the COVID-19 pandemic